Long Live the Pimp is the fifth solo studio album by American rapper Pimp C. It was released on December 4, 2015, on the eighth anniversary of his death, making it his third posthumous solo release. Production was handled primarily by Mr. Lee, except for six tracks. The album features guest appearances from Juicy J, Bun B, Lil' Keke, 8Ball & MJG, A'Doni, A$AP Rocky, David Banner, Devin the Dude, E.S.G., Nas, Lil' Wayne, Slim Thug and Ty Dolla $ign.

The song "Wavybone" also appeared on A$AP Rocky's album At.Long.Last.A$AP.

Track listing

Notes
Track 4 contains elements of "Could I Be Falling in Love" as performed by Syl Johnson and written by Earl Randle, Lawrence Seymour, Willie Mitchell and Yvonne Mitchell.

Personnel

Chad Lamont Butler – main artist, producer (track 12), executive producer
Jordan Michael Houston – featured artist & producer (tracks: 4, 8, 13), co-executive producer
Bernard James Freeman – featured artist (tracks: 4, 7)
Marcus Lakee Edwards – featured artist (tracks: 6, 9)
Dwayne Michael Carter Jr. – featured artist (track 2)
Devin C. Copeland – featured artist (track 3)
Tyrone William Griffin, Jr. – featured artist (track 3)
Rakim Mayers – featured artist (track 4)
Alexis Thomas – featured artist (track 6)
Cedric Dormaine Hill – featured artist (track 6)
Stayve Jerome Thomas – featured artist (track 6)
Marlon Jermaine Goodwin – featured artist (track 7)
Premro Smith – featured artist (track 7)
Lavell William Crump – featured artist (track 10)
Nasir bin Olu Dara Jones – featured artist (track 13)
Leroy Williams, Jr. – producer (tracks: 1-3, 5-7, 9-11, 14), mixing (tracks: 1-3, 5-10, 12-14), co-executive producer
Matthew A. Taylor – producer (tracks: 15, 16)
Hector Delgado – additional producer & recording (track 4)
Michael Anthony Foster – additional producer (tracks: 4, 8, 13)
Jeremiah "Lil Awree" Owens – additional producer (tracks: 4, 8, 13)
Cory Moore – additional producer (track 16), additional recording (tracks: 3, 6)
Raymond Murray – additional producer (track 16)
Derek "MixedByAli" Ali – mixing (track 4)
James Hunt – assistant mixing (track 4)
Matt Schafer – assistant mixing (track 4)
Rogelio Moya – mixing (track 11)
Norman "MouseQuake" Barrett – mixing (track 15), assistant engineering (tracks: 1-3, 6-7, 9-10, 13-14)
Rogelio Moya – mixing (track 16)
Mike Moore – assistant engineering (track 1)
John "Jonny Kash" Hoard – assistant engineering (track 3)
Piston Push Keys – additional drum programming (track 6)
Raymond "Rayface" Thomas – assistant engineering (track 12)
Mark "Exit" Goodchild – additional recording (track 13)
Gabriel Zardes – assistant additional recording (track 13)
Blake La Grange – mastering
Chinara Butler – executive producer, liner notes
Christian Butler – executive producer
Mike Lukowski – art direction
Cherrell Rene Proctor – management

Charts

References

External links

2015 albums
Pimp C albums
Mass Appeal Records albums
Albums produced by Juicy J
Albums published posthumously